Synneuron is a genus of gnats, gall midges, and March flies in the family Canthyloscelidae. There are at least four described species in Synneuron.

Species
These four species belong to the genus Synneuron:
 Synneuron annulipes Lundstrom, 1910
 Synneuron decipens Hutson, 1977
 Synneuron decipiens Hutson, 1977
 Synneuron sylvestre Mamaev & Krivosheina, 1969

References

Psychodomorpha genera
Articles created by Qbugbot